Ialtris is a genus of snakes in the subfamily Dipsadinae of the family Colubridae. The genus is endemic to the island of  Hispaniola.

Geographic range
Species of the genus Ialtris are found in the Dominican Republic and Haiti.

Species and subspecies
The genus Ialtris contains the following four species which are recognized as being valid. One of these species, I. haetianus, has three recognized subspecies, including the nominotypical subspecies.
Ialtris agyrtes - Barahona red-headed racer, Barreras fanged snake
Ialtris dorsalis  - Hispaniolan W-headed racer, brown fanged snake
Ialtris haetianus - Hispaniolan upland racer, Haitian ground snake
Ialtris haetianus haetianus 
Ialtris haetianus perfector 
Ialtris haetianus vaticinata 
Ialtris parishi  - Tiburon banded racer,  Parish's fanged snake

Nota bene: A binomial authority or trinomial authority in parentheses indicates that the species or subspecies, respectively, was originally described in a genus other than Ialtris.

References

Further reading
Boulenger GA (1896). Catalogue of the Snakes in the British Museum (Natural History). Volume III., Containing the Colubridæ (Opisthoglyphæ and Proteroglyphæ) ... London: Trustees of the British Museum (Natural History). (Taylor and Francis, printers). xiv + 727 pp. + Plates I-XXV. (Genus Ialtris and species I. dorsalis, p. 137, Figure 7 + Plate VII, figure 2).
Cope ED (1862). "Synopsis of the Species of Holcosus and Ameiva, with Diagnoses of new West Indian and South American Colubridæ". Proceedings of the Academy of Natural Sciences of Philadelphia 14: 60–82. (Ialtris, new genus, p. 74).
Schwartz A, Henderson RW (1991). Amphibians & Reptiles of the West Indies: Descriptions, Distributions, and Natural History. Gainesville, Florida: University of Florida Press. 720 pp. . (Darlingtonia haetiana, p. 598; Ialtris agyrtes, I. dorsalis, I. parishi, p. 614).
Schwartz A, Thomas R (1975). A Check-list of West Indian Amphibians and Reptiles. Carnegie Museum of Natural History Special Publication No. 1. Pittsburgh, Pennsylvania: Carnegie Museum of Natural History. 216 pp. (Darlingtonia haetianus, pp. 181–182; Ialtris dorsalis, pp. 187–188; I. parishi, p. 188).

Ialtris
Snake genera
Endemic fauna of Hispaniola
Reptiles of the Dominican Republic
Reptiles of Haiti
Taxa named by Edward Drinker Cope